Leopoldo García-Colín Scherer (27 November 1930, in Mexico City – 8 October 2012, in Mexico City) was a Mexican scientist specialized in Thermodynamics and Statistical Mechanics who received  the National Prize for Arts and Sciences in 1988.

He was a member of The National College, a former president of the Mexican Society of Physics (SMF, 1972–1973) and has received honorary degrees from several universities, including the National Autonomous University of Mexico (UNAM) and the Metropolitan Autonomous University (UAM).

Career 

He obtained a Chemistry degree at  Universidad Nacional Autónoma de México (UNAM) in 1953. The Ph.D. in Physics at the University of Maryland in 1959. He was professor at Benemérita Universidad Autónoma de Puebla from 1960 to 1963, and at Facultad de Ciencias in UNAM from 1967 to 1984. Later, he participated in research at the Centro Nuclear de Salazar, a Nuclear center in Mexico; assistant director of Basic Investigation of Processes at Instituto Mexicano del Petróleo from 1967 to 1974, professor at Instituto de Investigaciones de Materiales in UNAM during the period from 1984 to 1988. At the end of his career he had a tenure position at   Universidad Autónoma Metropolitana at Iztapalapa. He was elected to El Colegio Nacional in September 12, 1977. He was member of  the Sistema Nacional de Investigadores with the highest level, III, since 1988. He received a honoris causa Ph. D from the National University of Mexico in April, 2007.

References

External links 
 Biography at The National College 

2012 deaths
Scientists from Mexico City
Members of El Colegio Nacional (Mexico)
20th-century Mexican physicists
National Autonomous University of Mexico alumni
University of Maryland, College Park alumni
Academic staff of the Meritorious Autonomous University of Puebla
Academic staff of the National Autonomous University of Mexico
Academic staff of Universidad Autónoma Metropolitana
1930 births
TWAS fellows